Harvey Milk Day is organized by the  Harvey Milk Foundation and celebrated each year on May 22 in memory of Harvey Milk, a gay rights activist who was assassinated in 1978. Milk was a prominent gay activist during the 20th century. He ran for office three times before becoming the first openly gay person elected to California public office, where he served as a city supervisor. Harvey Milk Day came about as a day to remember and teach about Milk's life and his work to stop discrimination against the LGBTQIA+ community.

California Day of Special Significance
In California, Harvey Milk Day is recognized by the state's government as a day of special significance for public schools.  The day was established by the California legislature and signed into law by Governor Arnold Schwarzenegger in 2009 after a series of petitions led by gay rights activist Daren I. Ball and in the wake of the award-winning  feature film Milk retracing Milk's life.

Legislative history

See also

 Public holidays in the United States

References

External links 
 Harvey Milk Foundation
 Official Harvey Milk Day Website

May observances
Public holidays in the United States
LGBT events in California
LGBT law in the United States
California law
2009 in American law
2009 in LGBT history
2008 in American law
2008 in LGBT history
Harvey Milk
LGBT politics in the United States
State holidays in the United States